The 18463 / 18464 Prashanti Express is a daily train that runs between Bhubaneswar and Bangalore which used to run between Visakhapatnam and Bangalore previously. It leaves Bhubaneswar railway station at 05:40 a.m and reaches Bangalore City railway station the next day at 11:45 a.m. The duration of journey is approximately 30 hours. It operates as train number 18463 from Bhubaneswar to Bangalore and as train number 18464 between Bangalore and Bhubaneswar.Its Previous number was 18563 and 18564

History
The train was introduced on 22 November 1998 between Visakhapatnam and Bangalore. It was extended to Bhubaneswar on 20 February 2007 and since then it is running between Bhubaneswar and Bangalore.

Route & Halts

Traction
The train uses WAP-7 of Vishakapatnam shed between Bhubaneswar and Vishakapatnam and then it changes to WAP-7 of BZA shed from Vishakapatnam to Bengaluru.

Coach composition
It has 1 2AC, 4 3AC, 11 Sleeper, 4 General and 2 SLR (EOG cum luggage) coaches. It also has a pantry car for on board catering.

Accident
The locomotive and two coaches behind it derailed as the train entered the yard of Bangalore city railway station at 12:15 p.m on 29 August 2015. No passengers were hurt.

References

Transport in Bangalore
Transport in Bhubaneswar
Named passenger trains of India
Rail transport in Andhra Pradesh
Rail transport in Karnataka
Railway services introduced in 1998
Express trains in India